Tokko is a rural locality (a selo), the administrative centre of and one of three settlements, in addition to Zharkhan and Uolbut, in Zharkhansky National Rural Okrug of Olyokminsky District in the Sakha Republic, Russia. Its population as of the 2002 Census was 978.

Geography
The settlement is located by the Tokko river,  from Olyokminsk, the administrative center of the district.

References

Notes

Sources
Official website of the Sakha Republic. Registry of the Administrative-Territorial Divisions of the Sakha Republic. Olyokminsky District. 

Rural localities in Olyokminsky District